William S. Bowdern (February 13, 1897 - April 25, 1983) was a Catholic priest of the Society of Jesus in St. Louis, Missouri. He was the author of The Problems of Courtship and Marriage printed by Our Sunday Visitor in 1939. He was a graduate of and taught at St. Louis University High School; he also taught at St. Louis University. 

Bowdern participated in an exorcism of Roland Doe in 1949. The incident became the basis of William Peter Blatty's 1971 novel The Exorcist.

Exorcism

In 1949, Bowdern was assisted in the exorcism of an anonymously named boy by fellow Jesuit priest Walter Halloran. Author William Peter Blatty contacted Bowdern as part of his research for his novel The Exorcist. In a 2000 TV movie titled Possessed, Bowdern was played by Timothy Dalton.

References

External links
Interview in which Father Bowdern is mentioned.
Interview with Father Halloran (2000).

1897 births
1983 deaths
20th-century American Jesuits
American exorcists
Catholic exorcists
Saint Louis University faculty